is a junior college in Higashisumiyoshi-ku Osaka, Japan, and is part of the Osaka University of Arts network.

The Junior College was founded in 1951 as Naniwa Gaikokugo Tanki Daigaku by Hideyo Tsukamoto. The predecessor of the school, a Hirano Eigaku-Juku, was founded in 1945. The 
course of Childcare was founded in 1953. The Distance education was founded in 1955. The foundation of Distance education course is the earliest in Japanese Junior Colleges.

External links
 Osaka University of Arts Junior College

Education in Osaka
Educational institutions established in 1951
Japanese junior colleges
Private universities and colleges in Japan
Universities and colleges in Osaka Prefecture
Distance education institutions based in Japan
1951 establishments in Japan

Alumni

Asuka – WWE Superstar.